Eden College is a private secondary school located in Quatre Bornes, Mauritius. Students are prepared for the School Certificate (O Level) and the Higher School Certificate (A Level).

See also
 List of secondary schools in Mauritius 
 Education in Mauritius

References

Boys' schools in Mauritius
Educational institutions established in 1951
Secondary schools in Mauritius
1951 establishments in Mauritius